The Memorial Head or Nsodie is a type of 17th to 18th century ceramic portrait sculpture of the Akan peoples, believed to have been created by women artists depicting royal personages. They are represented in the collection of the Metropolitan Museum of Art and elsewhere.

Early history and creation 
The Memorial Head (Nsodie) at the Metropolitan Museum of Art was created in the 17th–mid-18th century.
It was found in  Ghana, Twifo-Heman traditional area from the Akan peoples. These heads were commissioned by the Akan peoples to memorialize royal personages before death.  It was thought that elderly women artists fulfilled these commissions. These heads were placed in memorial groves called asensie, or “place of the pots,”where prayers, libations and offerings could be offered.

Description and interpretation 
The work depicts a human head and is made of terra cotta. There is a difference of opinion as to whether the heads depicted specific priests, chiefs, or royal personages or if they were commemorative effigies embodying the wisdom, experience and knowledge of important people. The heads are thought to stylize particular features of a personage and are not a realistic depiction.

References 

African sculpture
Akan
Ceramic sculptures
Ghanaian art
Busts (sculpture)
Created via preloaddraft
Metropolitan Museum of Art 2021 drafts
Ceramics of the Metropolitan Museum of Art
Sculptures of the Metropolitan Museum of Art
Funerary art